Rome is the name of some places in the U.S. state of Wisconsin:

Rome, Adams County, Wisconsin, a town
Rome (community), Adams County, Wisconsin, an unincorporated community
Rome, Jefferson County, Wisconsin, a census-designated place
Rome, Wisconsin, a fictional town in the television series Picket Fences
Rome, Wisconsin, a fictional town in Ayn Rand's Atlas Shrugged

See also
New Rome, Wisconsin, an unincorporated community